La Emilia is a small town in the San Nicolás Partido of Buenos Aires Province, Argentina.

Sport
The town is home to Club Social y Deportivo La Emilia football club; the team play in the Torneo Argentino B (as of 2008) and are an immense source of pride to the community.

External links
 Unofficial website

Populated places in Buenos Aires Province
Populated places established in 1892
San Nicolás Partido

pl:La Emilia San Nicolas